Nossegem is a town located near Brussels, the capital of Belgium. It is part of Zaventem municipality, in the Flemish Brabant province.

In 2005, the Nossegem Curve was opened, which connects Brussels Airport with the railway in the direction of Leuven.

References

External links
Official website of the municipality Zaventem

Populated places in Flemish Brabant
Zaventem